The Magnificent may refer to:

 "The Magnificent" (song), a 1995 song by the One World Orchestra
 The Magnificent (DJ Jazzy Jeff album), 2002
 The Magnificent (Keith Sweat album), 2009
 The Magnificent (Beenie Man album)
 List of people known as the Magnificent

See also 
 Magnificent (disambiguation)
 The Magnificents (disambiguation)
 Magnificence (disambiguation)